T. T. Daniel was an Indian politician and former Member of the Legislative Assembly. He was elected to the Travancore-Cochin assembly as a Tamil Nadu Congress candidate from Colachel constituency in Kanyakumari district in 1954 election. This was the first ever election held in this constituency and it happened before Kanyakumari district merged with Tamil Nadu.

References 

Tamil Nadu politicians